Kelly Jenrette is an American actress. She is known for her roles on Grandfathered and Manhunt: Deadly Games. She received a Nomination Primetime Emmy Award for Outstanding Guest Actress in a Drama Series nomination for her guest appearance on The Handmaid's Tale.

Filmography

Film

Television

References

External links 

 

21st-century American actresses
American film actresses
American television actresses
Living people
African-American actresses
Year of birth missing (living people)
21st-century African-American women
21st-century African-American people